Nidderdale Museum is a local and social history museum in the market town of Pateley Bridge in Nidderdale, one of the Yorkshire Dales, in North Yorkshire, England. The museum is housed in a former workhouse, and is normally open every day from 1.30 p.m. to 4.30 p.m. from 1 April to 31 October, and on Saturdays and Sundays from 1.30 p.m. to 4.30 p.m. over the winter.  There is a small entry charge for adults. Accompanied children are free.

The museum is run by volunteers. The Nidderdale Museum Society has two hundred members, with an elected Committee, and a Board of Trustees.

Exhibits 
The exhibits focus on rural life, with sections devoted to agriculture, local industries, religion, transport and costume, set out across 11 rooms. Displays include re-creations of a Victorian schoolroom, a cobbler's workshop, a lead mining tunnel, a Victorian parlour, general store, a 1930s hairdresser's shop and a kitchen. Other displays include historic costumes, agriculture tools and equipment, local industries and transport vehicles.

The museum also has a reference library of books relating to the local history and life of Nidderdale, and materials for local and family history research.

History of the museum 
The museum was established in 1975 by a group of local enthusiasts.  Some of the group had been members of the local history class which wrote A History of Nidderdale, first published in 1967, and they invited Bernard Jennings, editor of the History, to become one of the first trustees.  Harrogate Borough Council provided premises for the museum in the redundant offices of the Ripon and Pateley Bridge Rural District Council, originally built as a workhouse in 1863.

In 1990 the museum won the National Heritage Museum of the Year Award for "The Museum which does the Most with the Least".  In 2017 the volunteers at Nidderdale Museum were honoured with the Queen's Award.

References

External links
 Nidderdale Museum web site

Nidderdale
Museums in North Yorkshire
Local museums in North Yorkshire
Rural history museums in England
Pateley Bridge